The R393 road is a regional road in Ireland linking Longford to Mullingar in County Westmeath.

Its route runs north of the Royal Canal and south of the N4 national primary road – both of which also join Longford to Mullingar, as does the Dublin-Sligo railway line.

See also
Roads in Ireland
National primary road
National secondary road

References
Roads Act 1993 (Classification of Regional Roads) Order 2006 – Department of Transport

Regional roads in the Republic of Ireland
Roads in County Longford
Roads in County Westmeath